The Ivy City–Franklin Square Line, designated Route D4, is a daily bus route operated by the Washington Metropolitan Area Transit Authority between Ivy City and Franklin Square. The line operates every 17-20 minutes during the weekday peak-hours, and 30-35 minutes at all other times. Route D4 trips are roughly 32 minutes.

Background
Route D4 operates daily between Ivy City and Franklin Square via K Street connecting riders from Ivy City and NoMa to Downtown.

Route D4 currently operates out of Bladensburg division.

History
Route D4 began operation under the Washington Railway & Electric Company operating under streetcar lines operating between Ivy City and Downtown DC. The line was converted to bus in the 1920s and later acquired by the Capital Traction Company in 1933. DC Transit would acquire CTC in 1956 and later run by WMATA in 1973.

The D4 would mainly operate along K Street and MacArthur Boulevard between Sibley Memorial Hospital and Ivy City connecting Downtown. The line was named the Glover Park-Trinidad Line.

In the mid 1990s, route D4 was shortened to Washington Union Station with service to Sibley Memorial Hospital replaced by route D3, and D6. The line was also renamed to the Ivy City-Union Station Line. These changes were in order to simplify the line after a series of proposals.

On December 27, 2009, route D4 was rerouted to serve Franklin Square/McPherson Square station instead of Washington Union Station terminating along 13th and I streets NW. Service to Union Station was replaced by route D6. Buses will operate along I Street to 14th street, then continue via 14th, K and 10th streets, New York and Massachusetts Avenues, 6th Street and K Street to North Capitol Street where it will resume its regular route.

Originally, WMATA proposed to extend the D4 into Georgetown to serve Sibley Memorial Hospital instead of ending at Franklin Square.

In 2012, WMATA proposed to extend route D4 to Fort Totten station and Riggs Park via 18th Street NE, South Dakota Avenue NE, Sargent Road, Eastern Avenue, Kennedy Street, Nicholson Street and Riggs Road. This was in order to replace the E2 which is proposed to be shorten to Fort Totten and fully replace routes E3 and E4, Provide a direct route from Riggs Park, South Dakota Avenue, and 18th Street to Downtown, serve the proposed future Walmart stores on Riggs Road and at Bladensburg Road & New York Avenue, and ridership on the Fenwick/New York/16th loop is minimal since the Hecht's Warehouse closed. The Ivy City loop along  Fenwick Street, New York Avenue, and 16th Street NE would be eliminated.

In 2015, WMATA proposed to extend route D4 to Kennedy Center in order to replace route 80 which was proposed to be shorten to Franklin Square. This would give D4 service to Farragut Square, Foggy Bottom, and the Watergate complex.

On June 26, 2016, every other route D4 trip was extended to Dupont Circle station (20th & P Streets NW) serving both Dupont Circle and Farragut Square in order to partially replace route D3. The extension would only operate during the weekday peak-hours in the peak direction. This gives passengers weekday peak service to Farragut Square and Dupont Circle without having to transfer buses at Franklin Square.

In 2019, WMATA proposed to eliminate route D4 service after 10:00 PM daily due to low ridership. There would be no alternative service however. 

The proposal was met with controversy with Ivy City residents due to service being lacking with service if the proposal goes through since the E2 was also proposed to end at 10:00 PM too. WMATA later backed out of the proposal due to major customer opposition.

During the COVID-19 pandemic, all route D2 service was reduced to operate on its Saturday supplemental schedule beginning on March 16, 2020. However beginning on March 18, 2020, route D4 was further reduced to operate on its Sunday schedule on March 18, 2020. All weekend service was also suspended on March 21, 2020. On August 23, 2020, service was restored on the D4 but service to Dupont Circle remained suspended.

In February 2021, WMATA proposed to eliminate all D4 service if they did not get any federal funding. On September 5, 2021, service to Dupont Circle was eliminated.

References

D4